Avaz, or Awaz (Persian: آواز) is an unmetered vocal section of a mode in Persian music.

In the years 1965 and 1966, Mahmoud Karimi (maestro of Persian vocal music) performed the whole Avazs which were recorded and transcribed by Mohammad-Taghi Massoudieh. This version was published in 1997 in Tehran.

References
Massoudeih, M. T. (1997). Radīf-i āvāzī-i mūsīqī-i sunnatī-i Īrān. Persian Music Association, Tehran. .

External links
 
http://fis-iran.org/en/content/classical-persian-music-archives - Foundation of Iranian Studies Official Site

Persian music
Vocal music